Killeen Farmhouse Cheese is a small farmhouse cheese maker based from a farm on the banks of the river Shannon near Portumna County Galway, Ireland.

History 
Killeen Farmhouse Cheese was begun in 2004 by Marion Roeleveld on a farm on the northern coast of Lough Derg outside Portumna in County Galway. Roeleveld trained in cheesemaking in her native Netherlands but had no first-hand personal experience in making cheese. She first started making individual cheese wheels to order and settled on a style of Gouda cheese made from goats' milk from her own herd of around 40 goats and cows' milk from a neighbour's herd.

Roeleveld's uses milk from her herd of Saanen goats, a breed popular in Switzerland. Today, Roeleveld has a herd of around 200 goats.

Products
 Killeen Goat Gouda is made with pasteurised goats' milk in 5kg wheels and matured for between 2 and 12 months
 Killeen Cow Gouda is made with pasteurised cows' milk in 5kg wheels and matured for between 2 and 12 months

Awards
Killeen Farmhouse Cheese is one of Ireland's most successful cheese makers and has won many prestigious awards including the title of "Supreme Champion" at the Irish Cheese Awards on multiple occasions and gold medals at the British Cheese Awards and the World Cheese Awards.

    2011 British Cheese Awards - Best Goat Cheese
    2011 Irish Cheese Awards - Supreme Champion
    2011 World Cheese Awards - Best Irish and "Super Gold"
    2012 British Cheese Awards - Best Irish Cheese, Best Modern British
    2014 Irish Cheese Awards - Supreme Champion
    2014 British Cheese Awards - Best Goat Cheese
    2016 British Cheese Awards - Gold medal and Bronze medal
    2018 British Cheese Awards - Best Modern British Cheese
    2019 Irish Cheese Awards - Supreme Champion
    2019 World Cheese Awards -  Gold medal

See also
 List of goat milk cheeses

References

External links
 Official website of Killeen Farmhouse Cheese

Dairy products companies of Ireland
Cheesemakers
Goat's-milk cheeses
Irish cheeses